Walter Davidson may refer to:

Walter Davidson, Sr., founder of Harley-Davidson
Walter Edward Davidson (1859–1923), British colonial governor (Newfoundland, New South Wales)
Walter I. Davidson (1895–1985), Philadelphia businessman, civic leader, and politician
Walter Davidson (Canadian politician), member of the Legislative Assembly of British Columbia

See also
Walter Davison (1581–1608?), poet
Walther Davisson (1885–1973), German musician